Lost and Found is a 2006 album by Daniel Johnston, his 16th release since 1981.

Track listing

References 

Daniel Johnston albums
2006 albums